Integrated Health Information Systems (IHiS), is a health information agency operating within Singapore. It was founded in 2008 by the Ministry of Health, Singapore.

Background 
The National Electronic Health Record (NEHR) is a secure system that collects and organizes patient health care records into a single system and is managed by IHiS. This gives authorised healthcare professionals a holistic picture of a patients’ healthcare history. NEHR has become the digital backbone of Singapore’s healthcare system and a critical node for continuity of care.

In 2015, IHiS established the HealthHub, a web portal and mobile application for national health information and services. It allows Singaporeans to view evidence-based health and wellness information, access health records, and perform transactions across public healthcare clusters such as appointments, bill payments and refilling of medication.

During the COVID-19, the IHiS developed several healthtech projects including, the Command, Control, and Communications (C3) System, which was co-developed by Tan Tock Seng Hospital and the IHiS, a healthtech project that provides real-time visibility on patient flow, staff deployment and inventory in a public hospital, giving an overview of the situation to decision makers. Key dashboards and monitors enable them to coordinate and provide better care for patients at a systemic level. Co-developed by and IHiS. One of the projects was the GPConnect system was transferred to IHiS following the merger of ISD and IHiS in November 2016, an integrated IT system that comprises a Clinic Management System (CMS) and an Electronic Medical Records (EMR) system originally developed under MOH Holdings - Information Systems Division (ISD) to support daily GP clinic operations. In January 2021, GPConnect was adopted and deployed within 2 weeks as the national EMR system for Singapore's COVID-19 vaccination operations (VacOps). As well the VacOps program which was established to support Singapore's vaccination operations (VacOps ), with an aim to deploy various HealthTech solutions to multiple vaccination centers (VCs), public health preparedness clinics (PHPCs) and polyclinics. IHiS also tech-enabled mobile vaccination teams (MVTs)  to visit community care facilities (CCF) such as nursing homes and residential facilities.

Recognitions 
 Singapore Computer Society Tech Leader Awards 2022 (Digital Achievers – Team) for PRPP.
 Singapore Computer Society Tech Leader Awards 2022 (Digital Achievers – Team) for GPConnect.
 Singapore Computer Society Enterprise Architecture Awards 2021 - Digital Transformation and Innovation.
 Singapore 100 Women in Tech List – Sylvia Wong, Director, Digital & Integration Services at IHiS.
 Singapore 100 Women in Tech List – Susan Lee, Chief Information Officer at Singapore General Hospital.
 2021 World Information Technology and Services Alliance (WITSA) Global ICT Excellence Awards - Runner-Up of the Innovative eHealth Solutions Award (Public Sector).
 SCS IT Leaders Awards 2021 (Infrastructure) for helping Singapore scale-up COVID-19 testing.
 SCS IT Leaders Awards 2021 (Entrepreneurship) for iThermo development.
 SCS IT Leaders Awards 2021 (Infrastructure) for TTSH-NCID COVID-19 HealthTech enablement.
 Jurong Community Hospital revalidated for EMRAM stage 6.
 SkillsFuture Employer Awards 2020.

Publications 
IHiS and its employees have been involved in the publication of several research papers, including;

References

External links 

 Official website

Healthcare in Singapore
Health care companies of Singapore